Frontier School Division is the largest geographical school division in Manitoba, Canada, covering most schools in northern Manitoba. With 41 schools operating across Manitoba, the Frontier School Division provides educational services to a larger geographical area than any other school division in Canada. A unique organization, the Frontier School Division operates schools in small Manitoba communities that are often only accessible by boat, air (float plane), rail, or winter ice road.

The widespread geography has necessitated that this single school division be sub-divided into five "areas", with the main division office located in Winnipeg, Manitoba.

Located at the Frontier Collegiate Institute campus is the Frontier Collegiate Residence, where high school students from around Area Four and isolated communities that do not have student populations to warrant the operation of a high school program are housed in dormitories so that they may complete their secondary schooling.

See also
List of school districts in Manitoba
Our People Will Be Healed, a 2017 documentary film about the Helen Betty Osborne Ininiw Education Resource Centre

Sources and external links 
Government of Manitoba - Education

Frontier School Division

School districts in Manitoba